Labby may refer to 

 Sherman Labby (1929–1998), American storyboard artist and production illustrator
 Labby, County Londonderry, a townland in County Londonderry, Northern Ireland
 Labrador Retriever, a breed of dog nicknamed "Labby"
 Jason "Labrat" Hawkins, Australian radio presenter
 Henry Labouchère (1831–1912), English politician, writer, publisher and theatre owner